The 1905 Texas Longhorns baseball team represented the Texas Longhorns baseball team of the University of Texas in the 1905 college baseball season.

Schedule and results

References

Texas
Texas Longhorns baseball seasons
1905 in sports in Texas